Nicolás Andrés Nicolay (born 9 October 1979) is an Argentine former professional footballer who played as a forward. His career began at the largest club in his province, Ferro Carril Oeste of General Pico.

Clubs
 Banfield 1998
 Huracán Buceo 1999
 Cruz Azul 1999–2000
 Colón de Santa Fe 2001–2002
 Villa Española 2003–2004
 Rampla Juniors 2005–2006
 Tacuarembó 2007
 Bella Vista 2008
 River Plate 2008
 Tacuarembó 2009
 Central Español 2010
 Ferro Carril Oeste 2011–2013
 General Paz Juniors 2013–2014
 Tacuarembó 2014–2015

References
 Profile at BDFA 
 Profile at Tenfield Digital 

1979 births
Living people
Association football forwards
Argentine footballers
Argentine expatriate footballers
Uruguayan Primera División players
Club Atlético Colón footballers
Club Atlético Banfield footballers
Cruz Azul footballers
Tacuarembó F.C. players
C.A. Bella Vista players
Expatriate footballers in Mexico
Expatriate footballers in Uruguay